"Body" is the third single released off the album Victory by The Jacksons. Marlon sang the song’s main verses while the rest of the group sang the chorus.

Neither Michael nor Jermaine appear in the music video, however it does feature the rest of The Jacksons, including Randy.

Reception
Cash Box magazine said "'Body' is a light dance song that neither disappoints nor fully succeeds. Marred slightly by overused chord patterns, the tune nevertheless has a good pulse and particularly noteworthy build-up to the chorus and features strong tracks and vocals throughout."

Personnel
 Marlon Jackson – lead and background vocals, keyboards, synthesizers, Linn programming, arranging
 Jackie, Michael, Randy and Tito Jackson – background vocals
 John Barnes – arranging, Fairlight computerized keyboard, additional synthesizers
 David Ervin – additional synthesizers
 David Williams – guitar
 Greg Wright – guitar solo
 Jonathan Moffett – Simmons drums
 Bill Bottrell – engineer, mixing
 Paul Erickson, Mitch Gibson, Bino Espinoza – assistant engineers
 Nelson Hayes – project coordinator

Charts

References

External links
Genius: Body - Lyrics

1984 singles
1984 songs
The Jackson 5 songs